Holleman is a surname. Notable people with the surname include:

Boyce Holleman (1924–2003), American war veteran, attorney, politician, and actor
Frederik David Holleman (1887–1958), Dutch and South African professor, ethnologist, and legal scholar
Joel Holleman (1799–1844), American politician and lawyer from Virginia
Johan Frederik Holleman (1915–2001), Dutch and South African professor, ethnologist, legal scholar, and author
Kim Holleman (born 1973), mid-career contemporary artist with interdisciplinary approach
Mitch Holleman (born 1994), American child actor, plays Jake Hart on the TV sitcom Reba
Saskia Holleman (1945–2013), Dutch actress, lawyer and model

See also
Holleman Elementary, school in Waller, Texas
Samuel Bartley Holleman House, historic home located in New Hill, North Carolina

Hallman (disambiguation)
Halman (disambiguation)
Hellman

Helman
Hileman (disambiguation)
Hillman

Holliman
Hollman
Hollmann

Holloman
Hollowman
Holman (disambiguation)

Holmen (disambiguation)
Holmon
Holmön

Holyman
Hulman (disambiguation)
Ohlman